Mia Anapnoi (One Breath) is an album by Antonis Remos released in 2003, which was certified triple platinum selling more than 140,000 copies.

Tracks listing
Its tracks are all titled in Greek:
Mia anapnoi - One breath
Stoma me stoma - Mouth with mouth
Pia nomizis oti ise - Who do you think you are
Noris - Early
Kamia san esena - No one like you
Kanenas den mbori na mas horisi - No one can split us apart
Ego ime edo - I am here
Ola hathikan - Everything got lost
Na 'xera ti thes - If only I knew what you want
Ma de yinete - But it can't happen
Tora se thelo - I want you now
Den ti fovame ti zoi - I'm not afraid of life
Kamia yineka - No woman
Nafthalini - Naphthalene

See also

 Antonis Remos

References

2003 albums
Antonis Remos albums